Mallala Motor Sport Park is a  bitumen motor racing circuit near the town of Mallala in South Australia, 55 km north of the state capital, Adelaide.

Mallala Race Circuit (1961–1971)

The Mallala Race Circuit, as it was originally known, was established on the site of the former RAAF Base Mallala. The land was purchased from the Royal Australian Air Force at public auction in 1961 by a group of enthusiasts seeking to create a replacement for the Port Wakefield Circuit. South Australia had been allocated the 1961 Australian Grand Prix on the state by state rotational system that applied at that time, but the organisers had subsequently been informed by the Confederation of Australian Motor Sport (CAMS) that the  Port Wakefield Circuit, which had hosted the 1955 Australian Grand Prix, was no longer suitable to host the event.

The opening meeting for the new venue was held on 19 August 1961 with Bib Stillwell winning the main event in a Cooper Climax. The 1961 Australian Grand Prix headlined the circuits second meeting with Lex Davison winning his fourth and last AGP driving a Cooper T51 Coventry Climax FPF.
 
Mallala served as South Australia's home of motor sport throughout the sixties and it hosted a round of the Australian Drivers' Championship each year from 1961 to 1971. The Australian Tourist Trophy was held there in 1962 and 1968 and the single race Australian Touring Car Championship was staged in 1963, as were annual rounds of the same championship after it changed to a series format in 1969. In 1971 the property was bought by Keith Williams who at the time owned the Surfers Paradise International Raceway, and was constructing the new Adelaide International Raceway. Mallala was closed in that year as Williams had a court ordered covenant placed on the property preventing any motor sport activities. This ensured that Adelaide International would become the new home of motor racing in SA.

Test Track

After the circuit's closure as a motor racing venue, Chrysler Australia, who had their manufacturing base in Adelaide, continued using the Mallala as their test track. Leading race drivers Leo and Pete Geoghegan, who were factory backed Chrysler drivers in Series Production racing, often tested vehicles such as the Chrysler Valiant Charger at the circuit. Mallala was also the test track for the Adelaide-based Elfin Sports Cars run by company founder Garrie Cooper. Elfin produced a variety of sports and Open-wheel race cars.

Mallala Motor Sport Park (1980–present)

Following the purchase of the Mallala site by South Australia businessman and Sports Sedan racer Clem Smith in 1977, a Supreme Court decision declared the covenant unenforceable. The facility was then redeveloped and was reopened for motorcycle racing in 1980 and for car racing in 1982. It was now known as Mallala Motor Sport Park.

The circuit was initially issued with a "B" track license, thus excluding the staging of championship level racing, and the track's biggest annual event became Historic Mallala which was held each Easter. This was upgraded to an "A" track license in 1984, allowing Mallala to stage Round 5 of the 1984 Australian Formula 2 Championship on 3 June won by Keith McClelland driving a Cheetah Mk 8-VW. This was the first national championship round to be staged at the circuit since the final round of the 1971 Australian Sports Car Championship on 14 November 1971 won by John Harvey driving a McLaren M6B-Repco.

National championship motor racing continued sporadically over the next few years, but the circuit was brought back into national focus when it was chosen over Adelaide International to host a round of the Australian Touring Car Championship each year from 1989 to 1998. When that championship evolved into the Shell Championship Series in 1999, the Mallala round was replaced by the Clipsal 500, held on a shortened version of the Adelaide Street Circuit in an exclusive deal between V8 Supercars and the John Olsen led Government of South Australia. A round of the second tier V8 Supercar Development Series was held at Mallala Motor Sport Park each year from 2000 to 2006 before also moving to the Adelaide Street Circuit in 2007.

On 7 May 1989, Mallala had the honour of hosting the first ever Formula Holden race as part of the opening round of the 1989 Australian Drivers' Championship. Mark McLaughlin driving a South Australian designed and built Elfin FA891 won the opening heat of the meeting from former dual Australian Formula 2 champion Peter Glover, with television commentator turned race driver Neil Crompton finishing third.

Currently the main meetings held annually are the Mallala Historics each Easter and a round of the Shannons Nationals Motor Racing Championships staged shortly afterwards. Drifting now takes place on a regular basis in the form of the G1 Drift Competition and Drift Supercup which runs from turn 8 to turn 2. Supertruck Racing is no longer staged at Mallala due to the deteriorating surface of the track, the final event being in late 2009. Major meetings at Mallala are run by the Sporting Car Club of South Australia and other clubs that regularly use the circuit include the Adelaide Superkart Club, Marque Sports Car Association of SA, and the MG Car Club of SA. Since its re-opening, the Mallala circuit has also been used for private driver training courses and the South Australia Police use the circuit for driver training and assessment.

The Mallanats is an annual car show held at the circuit since 2009. The weekend includes burnout competitions and various performance car events similar to the Summernats format. The event returned once a year in 2010 and 2011, with two Mallanats events being scheduled in 2012.

The Elfin Mallala sports racing car was named after the circuit, having competed in its first race there.

Ownership by Peregrine Corporation

Following the passing of owner Clem Smith in February 2017 the Peregrine Corporation, owners of the upcoming The Bend Motorsport Park, purchased the complex and took over the operations in May the same year. Peregrine Corporation is owned by the Shahin family who also own On the Run (convenience store) in Australia.

Major events

Australian Grand Prix
In just its second race meeting, the Mallala Race Circuit hosted the 1961 Australian Grand Prix. The race was won by Lex Davison driving a Cooper T51 Coventry Climax FPF from Bib Stillwell, with David McKay finishing third. McKay finished first on the road, but was controversially penalised 60 seconds for an alleged jump start.

Australian Touring Car Championship
Each year from 1960 to 1968 the Australian Touring Car Championship was contested as single race, with Mallala hosting the title in 1963 on its original 3.38 km (2.1 mi) layout. From 1969 onwards the championship was contested over a number of rounds with Mallala hosting a round each year from 1969 to 1971 and from 1989 to 1998. From 1972 to 1988 all ATCC rounds in South Australia were held at the Adelaide International Raceway. In 1999 the Australian Touring Car Championship was renamed to the Shell Championship Series with all South Australian rounds from that time held at a modified (shortened) version of the Adelaide Street Circuit.

In 1989 when the ATCC returned to Mallala after an absence of 18 years, the tight and bumpy circuit received mixed reviews from the top touring car drivers. Some, such as Nissan driver Jim Richards praised the circuit stating that the racing would be closer as it did not allow the all-powerful Ford Sierra RS500's to fully utilise their speed advantage. Others such as reigning (and that years) ATCC champion Dick Johnson were openly critical of the circuit and its lack of facilities, though some cynically noted that other than Bathurst, Johnson wouldn't admit to liking any circuit located outside of his home state of Queensland. Ironically, Dick Johnson would actually win the 1989 ATCC race at Mallala rather easily, claiming pole position and sprinting away from the field to win by 29 seconds after 60 minutes of racing. To his credit circuit owner Clem Smith would use the profits made from hosting Australia's highest profile race series which would regularly draw a capacity crowd despite not always having good weather, to continually upgrade the facilities at Mallala until the championship moved to Adelaide in 1999.

The following table lists the winner of the single race 1963 championship and the winners of each Australian Touring Car Championship round held at the Mallala circuit.

Australian Super Touring Championship
Mallala hosted the Australian Super Touring Championship (known as the Australian 2.0 Litre Touring Car Championship in 1993 and Australian Manufacturers' Championship in 1994) 8 times between 1993 and 2000–01.

V8 Supercar Development Series
Mallala Motor Sport Park hosted a round of the V8 Supercar Development Series each year from the inception of the series in 2000 through to 2006. Since 2007 all South Australian rounds have been held at the Adelaide Parklands Circuit.

Australian Drivers' Championship
Mallala Race Circuit hosted the South Australian round of the annual Australian Drivers' Championship each year from 1961 to 1971. Mallala Motor Sport Park has hosted rounds in numerous years since 1988.

Australian Formula 2 Championship
Australian Formula 2 Championship raced at Mallala 6 times between 1971 and 1988.

Australian Sports Sedan Championship
The Australian Sports Sedan Championship raced at Mallala 6 times between 1991 and 2003.

Australian Nations Cup Championship
The Australian Nations Cup Championship raced at Mallala in 2004. It would be the final ever round of the Nations Cup Championship for GT style cars.

Australian GT Championship
The Australian GT Championship raced at Mallala in 2006.

Lap records

As of February 2022, the official race lap records at Mallala Motor Sport Park are listed as:

See also
 Mallala (disambiguation)

Notes

References

External links
Mallala Motor Sport Park
Sporting Car Club of SA Inc
Marque Sports Car Association of SA Inc
MG Car Club of SA
South Australian Motor Racing Officials Association
RAAF Museum: RAAF base Mallala
Google Maps

Motorsport venues in South Australia
Former Supercars Championship circuits
Australian Grand Prix
Former Royal Australian Air Force bases